Annapurna Studios is an Indian film production company, founded in 1976 by the actor Akkineni Nageswara Rao (ANR). Located in the heart of Hyderabad, India the  studio mainly provides services for films including sound stages for set construction, outdoor sets, floors, back-lots, data storage, editing, dubbing, foley/SFX, visual effects, digital intermediate, Dolby Vision/HDR, stereo and near field mixing, Dolby Atmos sound mixing, 5.1/7.1/9.1 sound mixing, conforming and mastering, HD/UHD/DCP mastering, screening theatres among other amenities.

In 2011, the Akkineni Family launched a non-profitable educational institute called the Annapurna International School of Film and Media. ANR's family serve as directors on the company board.

Foundation
The studio was inaugurated by the then President of India Fakhruddin Ali Ahmed on 14 January 1976.

Studio floors and backlots
The second studio was built in 1978.

Located in the heart of Hyderabad, India the  studio mainly provides services for films including sound stages for set construction, outdoor sets, floors, back-lots, data storage, editing, dubbing, foley/SFX, visual effects, digital intermediate, Dolby Vision/HDR, stereo and near field mixing, Dolby Atmos sound mixing, 5.1/7.1/9.1 sound mixing, conforming and mastering, HD/UHD/DCP mastering, screening theatres among other amenities.

This new facility features green rooms for artists & technicians, in-house 1520 kV generator capacity, catwalk grids for easy light settings, cyclorama/bluemat for special effects and inbuilt fire-fighting and detection systems. It also includes a  space for dance rehearsals, photo-shoots and press-meets.

Within the first few months this new facility had catered to over 35–40 prominent Tollywood productions including Naayak, Gabbar Singh, Mirchi, Dammu, Julayi, Shadow, Baadshah, Greeku Veerudu and Iddarammayilatho. It also played host to TV Commercial shoots for Malabar Gold, Mahindra Tractor, Joy Allukas, Jos Allukas, Kalyan Jewellers. Shooting of 3D & Reality Show projects is in the pipeline.

Annapurna Pictures 

By the turn of the 1950s, Akkineni Nageswara Rao was a sought-after star. His friend-philosopher-guide and mentor from his theatre days, Dukkipati Madhusudana Rao felt it was the right time to launch an own production company. Thus was born Annapurna Pictures (P) Ltd, named after Madhusudana Rao’s stepmother. Besides Madhusudana Rao and Nageswara Rao, Katragadda Srinivasa Rao, Koratala Prakasa Rao and T. V. A. Subbarao were its partners. The company was registered in 1951 with Nageswara Rao as chairman and Madhusudana Rao as Managing Director.

The first film made on the banner was Donga Ramudu (1955). The film was co-written and directed by K. V. Reddy. It starred Akkineni Nageswara Rao, Savitri, and Jamuna, with music composed by Pendyala. The film was archived in the curriculum of the Film and Television Institute of India. It was dubbed in Tamil as Thiruttu Raman (1956). It was later remade in Hindi as Man-Mauji (1962) and again in Tamil as Vasanthi (1988).

Later Annapurna Pictures produced films like Thodi Kodallu (1957), Iddaru Mitrulu (1961), Chaduvukunna Ammayilu (1963), Doctor Chakravarty (1964), Aatma Gowravam (1965), Aatmiyulu (1969).

Film production

AA Combines

AS Combines

Great India Entertainments

Annapurna Pictures

1987 America Abbayi
1982 Pelleedu Pillalu
1978 Radha Krishna
1977 Prema Lekhalu
1974 Bangaaru Kalalu
1972 Vichitra Bandham
1971 Amayakuralu
1970 Jai Jawan
1969 Aatmiyulu
1967 Poola Rangadu
1965 Aatma Gowravam
1964 Doctor Chakravarty
1963 Chaduvukunna Ammayilu
1961 Iddaru Mitrulu
1961 Velugu Needalu
1959 Mangalya Balam
1957 Todi Kodallu
1955 Donga Ramudu

Television production

Annapurna International School of Film and Media
Annapurna International School of Film and Media is the only privately managed, non-profit film and media school in India.

It is also the only film school in India with government-accredited bachelor's, master's and MBA courses in film related subjects.

The school was launched in August 2011 by Actor & Chairman of Annapurna Studios, Akkineni Nageswara Rao and the Akkineni family with the intention of giving back to the community through their knowledge and experience in the field.

Many members from across the Indian film industry extended their support towards this non-profit film education. The advisory board includes Shabana Azmi, Mahesh Bhatt, Farah Khan, Rakeysh Omprakash Mehra, Javed Akhtar, Kamal Haasan, Tabu, Anurag Kashyap, Mani Ratnam, Gautham Vasudev Menon, S. S. Rajamouli, Deva Katta and Krish.

References

Film production companies based in Hyderabad, India
Film production companies of India
Indian companies established in 1975
Indian film studios
1975 establishments in Andhra Pradesh